Dr. Joseph Cecil Patrick (August 28, 1892 – April 12, 1965) invented Thiokol, America's first synthetic rubber in the early 1920s.  While seeking a formulation for automotive antifreeze, he attempted to hydrolyze ethylene dichloride with sodium polysulfide.  In doing so, he produced a brown, insoluble gum that later became known as Thiokol. He solved commercial production problems by inventing the suspension polymerization process, and solved compounding problems by degrading high molecular weight polymer to a low molecular weight liquid polymer.  This material is one of the principal binders for rocket propellant.

Patrick was the 1958 recipient of the Charles Goodyear Medal.

References

Polymer scientists and engineers
1892 births
1965 deaths